The Korfball events at the World Games 2009 took place at the NKNU Gymnasium, a sport arena in Kaohsiung, from Friday, July 17 to Tuesday, July 21, 2009.

Teams

Pool matches
Legend

Semifinals
5th-8th places

Semifinals

Finals

Final standings

External links
 Korfball at 2009 World Games

2009 World Games
2009
2009 in korfball
Korfball in Taiwan